Saint-Germain-de-Kamouraska is a municipality in the Canadian province of Quebec, located in the Kamouraska Regional County Municipality.

See also
 List of municipalities in Quebec

References

External links
 

Municipalities in Quebec
Incorporated places in Bas-Saint-Laurent